Onyang is an administrative division of Ulju County, Ulsan, South Korea. It is located south of Ulsan city center, east of the Busan-Ulsan expressway.

Sub-divisions 
Onyang is divided into 10 sub-divisions, or villages, called ri. These include:

Bal-ri
Daean-ri
Dongsang-ri
Gosan-ri
Mangyang-ri
Naegwang-ri
Namchang-ri
Oegwang-ri
Samgwang-ri
Unhwa-ri

See also
South Korea portal

References

External links 
 Official web site 

Ulju County
Towns and townships in Ulsan